The discography of Kristian Bush, an American singer, songwriter, producer, and multi-instrumentalist, consists of five Billy Pilgrim studio albums, six Sugarland studio albums, several solo releases, and a wide range of appearances, productions, songwriting cuts and charting singles.

While Bush is best known for being one-half of the international super-duo Sugarland, he has been leaving his mark on music for more than two decades.

Albums

Billy Pilgrim albums 
 St. Christopher's Crossing (March 26, 1992 Sister Ruby)
 Words Like Numbers (March 18, 1993 Sister Ruby)
 Billy Pilgrim (October 6, 1994 Atlantic Recording Corporation)
 Bloom (October 19, 1995 Atlantic Recording Corporation)
 In the Time Machine (April 12, 2001 Honest Harry)

Sugarland albums 

 Premium Quality Tunes (2003)
 Sugar in the Raw (2003)
 Twice the Speed of Life (2004)
 Enjoy the Ride (2006)
 Love on the Inside (2008)
 Live on the Inside (2009)
 Gold and Green (2009)
 The Incredible Machine (2010)

Solo albums and releases 
 Paint It All (March 19, 2002, self-released)
 "Love or Money" (March 28, 2013 Songs of the Architect)
 "Trailer Hitch" (July 28, 2014 Streamsound Records under license from Architect Music Collective, LLC)
 "Southern Gravity" (2015) Streamsound Records.

Songwriting

Charting singles 
 1994 "Insomniac" - Billy Pilgrim (Billy Pilgrim) +
 1995 "I Won't Tell" - Billy Pilgrim (Bloom) *
 2004 "Baby Girl" - Sugarland (Twice the Speed of Life) +
 2005 "Something More" - Sugarland (Twice the Speed of Life) +
 2005 "Stand Back Up" - Sugarland (Twice the Speed of Life)
 2006 "Down in Mississippi (Up to No Good)" - Sugarland (Twice the Speed of Life)
 2006 "Want To" - Sugarland (Enjoy the Ride) *
 2007 "Settlin'" - Sugarland (Enjoy the Ride) *
 2007 "Everyday America" - Sugarland (Enjoy the Ride) +
 2008 "All I Want to Do" - Sugarland (Love on the Inside) *
 2008 "Already Gone" - Sugarland (Love on the Inside) *
 2009 "It Happens" - Sugarland (Love on the Inside) *
 2009 "Joey" - Sugarland (Love on the Inside)
 2010 "Gold and Green" - Sugarland (Gold and Green)
 2010 "Stuck Like Glue" - Sugarland (The Incredible Machine) +
 2010 "Little Miss" - Sugarland (The Incredible Machine)
 2011 "Tonight" - Sugarland (The Incredible Machine)

(*) denotes Billboard No. 1
(+) denotes Billboard Top 10

Outside cuts 
 1999 "All of My Heroes" - The Blue Dogs (For The Record)
 2002 "All of My Heroes" - The Blue Dogs (Live at the Florence Little Theater)
 2006 "Wandering Moon" - Kristen Markinton (Wandering Moon)
 2006 "Blowing You Down" - Kristen Markinton (Wandering Moon)
 2006 "Come Back to Bed" - Kristen Markinton (Wandering Moon)
 2009 "Once Upon a Summertime" - Ellis Paul (A Summer Night in Georgia)
 2010 "Paper Dolls" - Ellis Paul (The Day After Everything Changed)
 2010 "The Day After Everything Changed" - Ellis Paul  (The Day After Everything Changed)
 2010 "River Road" - Ellis Paul (The Day After Everything Changed)
 2010 "Lights of Vegas" - Ellis Paul  (The Day After Everything Changed)
 2011 "Run" - Matt Nathanson (Modern Love)
 2012 "Burn" - James Patrick Morgan (James Patrick Morgan)
 2012 "She Won't Drive in the Rain Anymore" - The dB's (Falling Off the Sky)
 2012 "Stuck in the Middle" - Boys Like Girls  (Crazy World)
 2013 "Boy Who Cried Love" - Jaida Dreyer (I Am Jaida Dreyer)

Production credits 
 1985 Shades of Black - Flip
 1986 Pleasures Denied - Masada
 1987 Heroes - Flip
 1989 Saturday - Flip
 1990 Politics and Pocketchange - Kristian Bush
 1990 Big Backporch Songs - The Hyras
 1992 St. Christopher's Crossing - Billy Pilgrim
 1992 Christmas Present 1992 - Various Artists (Billy Pilgrim, "Let It Snow")
 1992 What's Up In the Attic? - Various Artists
 1993 Words Like Numbers - Billy Pilgrim
 1993 Durable Phig Leaf - Evan and Jaron
 1993 Naked Rhythm - Various Artists (Kristian Bush, "Insomniac")
 1994 Billy Pilgrim - Billy Pilgrim
 1994 True Story - Various Artists (Billy Pilgrim, "Last American Poet")
 1994 A Tribute to Bob Dylan Vol 2 - Various Artists (Kristian Bush, "Mama, You Been on My Mind")
 1995 Bloom - Billy Pilgrim
 1995 You Sleigh Me: Alternative Christmas Hits - Various Artists (Billy Pilgrim, "The First Noel")
 1996 Letters in the Dirt - Chuck Brodsky
 1996 Not from Concentrate - Evan and Jaron
 1996 Heartsongs - Various Artists (Kristian Bush, "RFD")
 1996 Skin and Water - Nance Pettit
 1998 New Blood - Beth Wood
 1998 Radio - Chuck Brodsky
 1999 Snow Globe - Billy Pilgrim
 2000 BeSides - Billy Pilgrim
 2000 Nine Twenty Three - Billy Pilgrim
 2000 Last of the Old Time - Chuck Brodsky
 2001 In the Time Machine - Billy Pilgrim
 2001 Shallow Hal Motion Picture Soundtrack - Various Artists (Ellis Paul, "Sweet Mistakes")
 2001 Sweet Mistakes - Ellis Paul
 2002 Baseball Ballads - Chuck Brodsky
 2002 Paint It All - Kristian Bush
 2003 Radio Motion Picture Soundtrack - Various Artists (Chuck Brodsky, "Radio")
 2003 Premium Quality Tunes - Sugarland
 2003 Sugar in the Raw - Sugarland
 2004 Twice the Speed of Life - Sugarland
 2006 Essentials - Ellis Paul
 2006 Wandering Moon - Kristian Markinton
 2006 Enjoy the Ride - Sugarland
 2007 A Place to Land - Little Big Town ("Life in a Northern Town")
 2008 Red House 25: A Silver Anniversary Retrospective - Various Artists (Chuck Brodsky, "The Ballad of Eddie Klepp")
 2008 Love on the Inside - Sugarland
 2009 Live on the Inside - Sugarland
 2009 Gold and Green - Sugarland
 2010 The Incredible Machine - Sugarland
 2010 2010 Grammy Nominees - Various Artists (Sugarland, "It Happens")
 2011 Modern Love - Matt Nathanson ("Run")
 2012 I Am Jaida Dreyer - Jaida Dreyer ("Boy Who Cried Love")
 2012 Act of Valor: The Album [Original Soundtrack] - Various Artists (Sugarland, "Guide You Home")

References 

Discographies of American artists
Country music discographies